The castra of Pinoasa was a fort in the Roman province of Dacia. Matei Dan dates the castra to the period of the Dacian Wars. Its ruins were destroyed by excavations at the Rovinari Coal Mine.

See also
List of castra

External links
Roman castra from Romania - Google Maps / Earth

Notes

Roman legionary fortresses in Romania
History of Oltenia